Kahanism is an extremist religious Zionist ideology based on the views of Rabbi Meir Kahane, founder of the Jewish Defense League and the Kach party in Israel. 

Kahane held the view that most Arabs living in Israel are enemies of Jews and Israel itself, and believed that a Jewish theocratic state, where non-Jews have no voting rights, should be created. 

The Kach party has been banned by the Israeli government. In 2004, the U.S. State Department designated it a Foreign Terrorist Organization. In 2022, it was removed from the U.S. terror blacklist due to "insufficient evidence" of the group's ongoing activity, but it remains a Specially Designated Global Terrorist (SDGT) entity.

The Otzma Yehudit party, which has been called Kahanist and anti-Arab, won six seats in the 2022 election and is a member of the current Israeli government.

History 
The Kach party saw electoral success in 1984, winning 26,000 votes, equivalent to one seat. Early polls after the election predicted that the Kach party would become the third-largest party, winning as many 12 seats in the next election. But in August 1985 the Kach party was barred from participating in elections. Some Kahanist groups, such as the Sicarii, decided to manifest their political goals violently instead. On November 5, 1990, Meir Kahane was assassinated by El-Sayyid A. Nosair, who was associated with terror cells that eventually became al-Qaeda.

Kahane's assassination led to the splintering of the Kach party, with Binyamin Ze'ev Kahane leading Kahane Chai from Kfar Tapuach and Kach led by Baruch Marzel, who eventually became a member of Otzma Yehudit. In 1992 both groups were banned completely from participating in elections. In 1994, due to the Cave of the Patriarchs massacre committed by Baruch Goldstein, they were declared illegal terrorist organizations by the Israeli government. After the ban, Kahane Chai's leaders created an extraparliamentary advocacy group, "The Kahane Movement", which archived media content from Kahane online.

The next election where Kahanists received political representation was in 2009, with Michael Ben-Ari, who ran on the National Union ticket. Ben-Ari split from the National Union after the election, forming Otzma Yehudit. Otzma Yehudit failed to pass the electoral threshold in the 2013 Israeli election.

Kahanism gained no political legitimacy until the April 2019 Israeli election. As a result of the Israeli political crisis, then Prime Minister Benjamin Netanyahu attempted to gain extra seats by appealing to Kahanist voters by making a deal with the Jewish Home to have them run on a joint list with Otzma Yehudit as the Union of Right Wing Parties. The party received enough seats for Otzma Yehudit to be represented, but Ben Ari, who was supposed to represent the 5th slot on the Union of Right Wing Parties list, was barred from running after the list was submitted. Otzma Yehudit eventually saw parliamentary representation in 2021, when Itamar Ben-Gvir won a seat as part of a joint list with the Religious Zionist Party.

The Otzma Yehudit (Jewish Power) party, which espouses Kahanism, won six seats in the 2022 Israeli legislative election and will be represented in what has been called the most right-wing government in Israeli history.

In November 2022, after a memorial event for Kahane attended by Ben-Gvir, the U.S. State department hosted a press briefing, saying, "Celebrating the legacy of a terrorist organization is abhorrent. There is no other word for it. It is abhorrent."

Ideology
Kahanism is a religious Zionist ideology that denotes the controversial positions espoused by Rabbi Meir Kahane. Kahane proposed that the State of Israel should enforce Jewish law, as codified by Maimonides, under which non-Jews who wish to dwell in Israel would have three options: remain as "resident strangers" with all rights but national ones, which would require non-Jews to accept resident-stranger status with all rights but political ones. Those unwilling to accept such a status will be required to leave the country with full compensation and those who refuse to do even that will be forcibly removed. 

Kahanism's central claim is that the vast majority of the Arabs of Israel are and will continue to be enemies of Jews and Israel itself, and that a Jewish theocratic state, governed by Halakha, absent of a voting non-Jewish population that includes Israel, Palestine, areas of modern-day Egypt, Jordan, Lebanon, Syria and Iraq, should be created.

According to Kahane, the term "Kahanism" is primarily used by people ignorant of Torah Judaism in order to discredit his ideology, which he asserts is rooted in Halakha and the same as Torah Judaism. "Meir Kahane did not hate the Arabs – he just loved the Jews", said his widow Libby in a 2010 interview.

Criticism and legal action
Since 1985, the Israeli government has outlawed political parties espousing Kahane's ideology as racist, and forbids their participation in the government. The Kach party was banned from running for the Knesset in 1988, while the two Kahanist movements formed after Kahane's assassination in 1990 were ruled illegal terrorist organizations in 1994 and the groups subsequently disbanded. But followers with militant Kahanist beliefs remain active, as seen below. In 2001, the Office of the United Nations High Commissioner for Human Rights called the official Kahanist website a hate site espousing prejudiced views in which "Arabs generally and Palestinians in particular are vilified."

U.S. terror designation
In 2004, the U.S. State Department designated Kach a Foreign Terrorist Organization. In 2022, it was removed from the U.S. terror blacklist due to "insufficient evidence" of the group's ongoing activity in the most recent five-yearly review, but it remains a Specially Designated Global Terrorist (SDGT) entity.

Kahanist groups

Notable Kahanist terrorists

Baruch Goldstein

The deadliest Jewish terrorist attack occurred when Baruch Goldstein, supporter of Kach, shot and killed 29 Muslim worshipers, and wounded another 150, at the Cave of the Patriarchs massacre in Hebron, in 1994. This was described as a case of Jewish religious terrorism by Mark Juergensmeyer. Goldstein was a medical doctor who grew up in Brooklyn and was educated at the Albert Einstein College of Medicine in the Bronx. He resettled in the Kiryat Arba settlement in the West Bank, and was politically active for years. Goldstein saw Kahane as a hero, and was Kahane's campaign manager when he ran for the Israeli parliament through the Kach party. When Goldstein was threatened with a court-martial for refusing to treat non-Jewish soldiers in the Israeli Defence Force, he declared: "I am not willing to treat any non-Jew. I recognize as legitimate only two religious authorities: Maimonides and Kahane."

Goldstein was denounced "with shocked horror" by Orthodox Jews, and most Israelis denounced Goldstein as insane. Israeli Prime Minister Yitzhak Rabin condemned the attack, calling Goldstein a "degenerate murderer", "a shame on Zionism and an embarrassment to Judaism".  At the same time, Goldstein's actions were praised by some extremist settlers; Yochay Ron said that he "felt good" when he heard the news, and also said that Jews were "at war with the Arabs" and "all Arabs who live here are a danger to us... they threaten the very existence of the Jewish community on the West Bank." Goldstein and other religious settlers at Beit Hadassah (both Kahanist and Gush Emunim) believe that the biblical lands on the West Bank are sacred, that Jews are required by God to occupy them, and that the presence of Muslims desecrates the Holy Land. After this attack, members of the Kach Party praised Goldstein's actions, and in the ensuing political turmoil, the Knesset banned Kach in Israel. The Shamgar Commission concluded that Goldstein acted alone.

Yoel Lerner

In October 1982, Yoel Lerner, a member of Kahane's Kach, attempted to blow up the Dome of the Rock in order to rebuild the Temple Mount site. He was sentenced to two and a half years in prison. Mark Juergensmeyer identified him as a Jewish religious terrorist, writing that he "yearned for a Jewish society in Israel. He hoped for the restoration of the ancient temple in Jerusalem, the exclusive right of Jews to settle on the West Bank of the Jordan River, and the creation of a state based on biblical law." Lerner had previously served a three-year sentence for heading a group that plotted to overthrow the government and establish a state based upon religious law.

Eden Natan-Zada
On August 4, 2005, Eden Natan-Zada, an AWOL Israel Defense Forces soldier, killed four Israeli Arab citizens and wounded several others when he opened fire on a bus in the northern Israeli town of Shfaram. Natan-Zada had recently moved to the settlement of Tapuach, site of a Kahanist yeshiva. He was handcuffed by Israeli police but then lynched by a mob.

Alleged Kahanist violence
Roadside shootings, stabbings and grenade attacks against Palestinians have been carried out in Jerusalem and the West Bank by individuals or groups suspected of having ties to the former Kach group. Aliases such as "The Committee for the Safety of the Roads", "The Sword of David" and "The Repression of Traitors" have been used. The US government claims that these are all aliases of "Kach". In 2002, a Kahanist group known as "Revenge of the Toddlers" claimed responsibility for a bombing attack at Tzur Baher, an East Jerusalem secondary school for Arab boys, that wounded seven. The group also claimed responsibility for the 2003 bombing of a Palestinian school in Jaba that injured 20 and was also thought to be linked to the 2002 Zil Elementary school bombing.

Non-Jewish support
James David Manning, chief pastor of ATLAH World Missionary Church, has endorsed aspects of Kahane's ideology.

References

External links
 Kahane Net Site 
 Kahane Tzadak
 HaMeir L'David
 Jewish Task Force
 Rabbi Meir Kahane's MySpace Page
 Kahanism and Democracy - A blog post by Rabbi Gil Student analyzing Rabbi Meir Kahane's ideology (Kahane-ism) and its contradiction with the democratic values of the State of Israel.

 
Ethnicity in politics
Political theories
Jewish nationalism
Judaism and violence
Racism in Israel
Eponymous political ideologies
Right-wing populism in Israel
Religious Zionism
Neo-Zionism
Anti-Arabism
Fascism
Terrorism in Israel
Meir Kahane